Wales rugby team can refer to the following -

Rugby union
 Wales national rugby union team
 Wales national under-20 rugby union team
 Wales national under-18 rugby union team
 Wales national rugby sevens team
 Wales A national rugby union team
 Wales women's national rugby union team

Rugby league
 Wales national rugby league team